Deolis Alexander Guerra (born April 17, 1989) is a Venezuelan professional baseball pitcher in the Oakland Athletics organization. He has previously played for the Milwaukee Brewers, Pittsburgh Pirates, Los Angeles Angels, Philadelphia Phillies and Oakland Athletics.

Career

New York Mets
Guerra signed with the New York Mets as a non-drafted free agent on July 2, 2005. He was named South Atlantic League Pitcher of the Week on July 30, 2006. On July 8, 2007, Guerra represented the New York Mets' organization for the World Team in Major League Baseball's All-Star Futures Game.

Minnesota Twins
Along with outfielder Carlos Gómez and pitchers Philip Humber and Kevin Mulvey, Guerra was traded to the Minnesota Twins for Johan Santana on January 29, 2008.

With the Fort Myers Miracle, he compiled a 7–2 record with a 4.83 earned run average in the first half of the 2008 season—helping his team capture the Florida State League (FSL) first-half West Division title. Guerra's first start in the second half of the 2008 season (Tuesday, July 1) was a 4–0 complete game shutout of the Tampa Yankees. He allowed only three hits, and retired 19 in a row between a first inning single by James Cooper and a one-out single by Andres Perez in the seventh. It marked the first shutout of Guerra’ professional career. For the second half, he went 4–7 with a 6.08 ERA in 13 starts.

The Miracle again captured the first half division title in 2009, this time in the FSL's newly realigned Southern Division, and Guerra brought a no hitter into the eighth inning of a July 3 game against the Charlotte Stone Crabs. With one out, Christian López broke it up with a double down the left field line. Guerra was promoted to the New Britain Rock Cats immediately after this game (July 7).  He was named FSL pitcher of the week for the week of June 29 through July 5. His combined record for Fort Myers and New Britain was 12–11 with a 4.89 ERA and 106 strikeouts.

On November 20, 2009, he was added to the Twins' 40-man roster. He began the 2010 season with New Britain, going 1–1 with a 3.07 ERA in five starts prior to being promoted to triple-A. During the 2012 season, the Twins converted Guerra into a relief pitcher. The Twins removed Guerra from their 40-man roster after the 2012 season.

Guerra competed for the Venezuelan national baseball team in the 2013 World Baseball Classic. He was hospitalized with a blood clot in his right shoulder in March 2013.

Pittsburgh Pirates
Guerra signed a minor league deal with the Pittsburgh Pirates in November  2014.

On June 27, 2015, The Pirates promoted him to the major leagues. He was designated for assignment on July 31. The Cleveland Indians claimed Guerra off of waivers, but the claim was rescinded due to Guerra experiencing knee inflammation, and was placed on the Pirates' disabled list. The Pirates designated Guerra for assignment after the 2015 season, but signed him to a minor league contract with an invitation to 2016 spring training.

Los Angeles Angels
On December 10, 2015, Guerra was claimed in the Rule 5 draft by the Los Angeles Angels.

On May 30, 2016, Guerra was designated for assignment, and outrighted to Triple-A on June 3. The next day, the Angels re-selected Guerra's contract, adding him to the 25-man roster.

On February 10, 2017, Guerra was designated for assignment.

Texas Rangers
On January 16, 2018, Guerra signed a minor league deal with the Texas Rangers. He elected free agency on November 2, 2018.

Milwaukee Brewers
On December 8, 2018, Guerra signed a minor league deal with the Milwaukee Brewers that included an invitation to spring training.

In 2019, Guerra opened the season with the San Antonio Missions. On July 4, the Brewers selected his contract. On July 6, Guerra was designated for assignment. He elected free agency on October 1. On October 18, 2019, the Brewers signed Guerra to a one-year Major League contract. On January 30, 2020, Guerra was designated for assignment following the Brewers' signing of David Phelps.

Philadelphia Phillies
On February 5, 2020, Guerra was claimed off outright waivers by the Philadelphia Phillies. On August 22, 2020, Guerra was designated for assignment by the Phillies.  In his time with the Phillies, Guerra pitched to a 1–3 record with an 8.59 ERA over 9 games.  Guerra elected free agency on October 14, 2020.

Oakland Athletics
On February 2, 2021, Guerra signed a minor league contract with the Oakland Athletics organization and was invited to Spring Training. On March 26, Guerra was released by the Athletics, but re-signed with the club the next day on a new minor league contract. On April 8, 2021, Guerra had his contract selected to the active roster to take the roster spot of the injured A.J. Puk. Guerra made a career-high 53 appearances for Oakland in 2021, pitching to a 4.11 ERA with 62 strikeouts in 65.2 innings pitched.

On April 7, 2022, Guerra was placed on the 60-day injured list with a sprained right ulnar collateral ligament. On April 13, it was announced that Guerra had undergone Tommy John surgery, and would miss the entire 2022 season. He was non tendered and became a free agent on November 18, 2022. On December 15, Guerra signed a minor league deal.

See also

 List of Major League Baseball players from Venezuela

References

External links

Deolis Guerra at Pura Pelota (Venezuelan Professional Baseball League)

1989 births
Living people
Fort Myers Miracle players
Gulf Coast Twins players
Hagerstown Suns players
Indianapolis Indians players
Los Angeles Angels players
Major League Baseball pitchers
Major League Baseball players from Venezuela
Milwaukee Brewers players
Navegantes del Magallanes players
New Britain Rock Cats players
Oakland Athletics players
People from Ciudad Guayana
Philadelphia Phillies players
Pittsburgh Pirates players
Rochester Red Wings players
Round Rock Express players
Salt Lake Bees players
San Antonio Missions players
St. Lucie Mets players
Venezuelan expatriate baseball players in the United States
World Baseball Classic players of Venezuela
2013 World Baseball Classic players
2017 World Baseball Classic players